Havighurst is a surname. Notable people with the surname include:

Marion Havighurst (1894–1974), American poet, novelist, and author of children's books
Robert J. Havighurst (1900–1991), American academic and writer
Walter Havighurst (1901–1994), American academic and writer, brother of Robert